Thomas Carroll or Tom Carroll may refer to:

Sports
Thomas Carroll (cricketer) (1884–1957), Australian
Tom Carroll (hurler) (fl. 1880s), Irish
Thomas Carroll (martial artist) (1938–1999), American
Tom Carroll (Australian footballer) (born 1939), with Carlton
Tom Carroll (English footballer) (born 1992), most recently with Swansea City
Tom Carroll (infielder) (1936–2021), American baseball infielder
Tom Carroll (pitcher) (born 1952), American baseball pitcher
Tom Carroll (surfer) (born 1961), Australian
Thomas Carroll (hurler) (born 1992), Irish

Other
Thomas King Carroll (1793–1873), governor of Maryland
Thomas H. Carroll (1914–1964), president of George Washington University
Thomas J. Carroll (1909–1971), Catholic priest and civil rights activist
Thomas Carroll (Greek Orthodox priest), Irish priest in the Greek Orthodox Church
Thomas J. Carroll III, Architect of the Capitol

See also
Tommy Carroll (disambiguation)